The Fern Cave Archeological Site, in Lava Beds National Monument near Tule Lake, California, was listed on the National Register of Historic Places in 1975.

The cave is open to ranger-led tours only by appointment.

A  area including the cave was listed on the National Register for its information potential.

References

Archaeological sites in California
National Register of Historic Places in Modoc County, California